Ichthyophis mindanaoensis, also known as Todaya caecilian or Mindanao Island caecilian, is a species of caecilian in the family Ichthyophiidae. It is endemic to the island of Mindanao, the Philippines.

Description
There are 308–317 transverse folds. The head is rounded and oval. The eyes are visible, covered by skin and slightly raised.

A collection of larvae likely belonging to this species measure  in total length, suggesting a relatively large size at metamorphosis. All but the largest larvae retain the lateral line system.

Habitat and conservation
It has also been recorded in agricultural land adjacent to remnant natural forest patches. Adults are subterranean and have usually been observed under rocks, decaying logs and debris, and in shallow pools of mountain streams, but also in soil beside irrigation ditches. The larvae occur in unpolluted streams, rivers, and quiet pools near streams.

This species has a very localized and patchy distribution, but it can be relatively abundant where it occurs. It is threatened by habitat loss and conversion, although it seems to be fairly adaptable, and might thereby not be significantly threatened, except locally. Furthermore, caecilians often killed because they are mistaken for snakes. Ichthyophis mindanaoensis is known from Mount Kitanglad Natural Park, Malagos Watershed Area, and Mount Apo Natural Park, all relatively well protected and enforced areas.

References

mindanaoensis
Amphibians of the Philippines
Endemic fauna of the Philippines
Fauna of Mindanao
Amphibians described in 1960
Taxa named by Edward Harrison Taylor
Taxonomy articles created by Polbot